Uroš Stepanović (born 27 February 1993) is a Serbian football midfielder.

References

External links
 
 

1993 births
Living people
Footballers from Belgrade
Serbian footballers
FK Zemun players
FK Rakovica players
FK Kolubara players
OFK Bačka players
FK Novi Pazar players
Serbian First League players
Serbian SuperLiga players
Association football midfielders